Akif Egemen Güven (born September 25, 1996) is a Turkish professional basketball player for Beşiktaş Emlakjet of the BSL on a loan from Anadolu Efes.

Turkish national team
He is a regular Turkish youth national team player. Güven won three straight championships during his youth national team career. He helped Turkey to 1st place at the 2012 FIBA Europe Under-16 Championship, 2013 FIBA Europe Under-18 Championship and 2014 FIBA Europe Under-18 Championship. He was named MVP and headed the All-Tournament Team as he averaged 13.8 points, 6.9 rebounds, 0.7 assists, 1.8 blocks at 2014 FIBA Europe Under-18 Championship.

Career statistics

Domestic leagues

References

External links
 TBLStat.net Profile
 Eurocup Profile
 FIBA Profile
 NBADraft.net Profile

1996 births
Living people
21st-century Turkish people
Afyonkarahisar Belediyespor players
Anadolu Efes S.K. players
Beşiktaş men's basketball players
Bursaspor Basketbol players
Centers (basketball)
Karşıyaka basketball players
Sportspeople from İzmir
Turkish men's basketball players
Türk Telekom B.K. players